Jimlín is a municipality and village in Louny District in the Ústí nad Labem Region of the Czech Republic. It has about 900 inhabitants.

Administrative parts
The village of Zěmechy is an administrative part of Jimlín. It is urbanistically fused with Jimlín.

References

Villages in Louny District